This page is a list of cultural depictions of Tony Blair onstage, in film and in other forms of fiction.

Television drama and film
 The Tony Blair Witch Project (2000) – Mike Martinez
 The Deal (2003) – Michael Sheen
 The Government Inspector (2005) – James Larkin
 A Very Social Secretary (2005) – Robert Lindsay
 The Queen (2006) – Michael Sheen
 The Amazing Mrs Pritchard (2006) – John Brolly
 The Alastair Campbell Diaries (2007) – Michael Sheen
 The Trial of Tony Blair (2007) – Robert Lindsay
 Confessions of a Diary Secretary (2007) – Damian Lewis
 W (2008) – Ioan Gruffudd
Quantum of Solace (2008) – Mathieu Amalric based his portrayal of Dominic Greene on Blair
 The Ghost Writer (2010) – Pierce Brosnan plays British prime minister Adam Lang, who is based on Blair
 The Special Relationship (2010) – Michael Sheen
 The Journey (2016) – Toby Stephens

Satire
 Spitting Image (1994–1996)
 Sermon from St. Albion's (1998) – Harry Enfield
 The Big Impression (2001) – Rory Bremner
 2DTV (2001) – Jon Culshaw
 Jeffrey Archer: The Truth (2002) – Steven Pacey
 The Simpsons: The Regina Monologues (2004) – Himself in cameo role
 TONY! The Blair Musical (2007) – James Duckworth
 Red Nose Day 2007 Catherine Tate Show Sketch (2007) – Himself
 Dead Ringers (2006–2007) – David Tennant and Jon Culshaw
 Headcases (2008)
 The Hunt for Tony Blair (2011) – Stephen Mangan

Literature
 St Albion Parish News (1997–2007), column in Private Eye
 Alan Clark Diaries: Volume 3: The Last Diaries 1993–1999 (2002) by Alan Clark
 Number Ten (2002) by Sue Townsend, in which British prime minister Edward Clare is based on Blair
 The Blunkett Tapes (2006) by David Blunkett
 Dan Blair - Pilot For The Foreseeable Future - satirical comic strip in The Times, in the style of 1950s British sci-fi icon Dan Dare
 The Blair Years (2007) by Alastair Campbell
 The Ghost by Robert Harris in which the British prime minister Adam Lang is based on Blair
 A View From The Foothills: The Diaries of Chris Mullin (2009) by Chris Mullin
 In the Presence of Mine Enemies by Harry Turtledove Charlie Lynton is almost certainly named for Anthony Charles Lynton Blair, Prime Minister of the United Kingdom at the time of the book's writing. Like Lynton, Blair was born in Edinburgh, but appears more English than Scottish in his speech and bearing. He was also born in the mid-1950s and became party leader in the mid-1990s. However, unlike Lynton, Blair is not a fascist.
 Stormbreaker (2000) by Anthony Horowitz. The book has a Prime Minister of the United Kingdom who hosts the grand opening of computers for schoolchildren. The book takes place in the year it was published;  Blair was Prime Minister of the United Kingdom at the time.

Radio
 Independence Day UK (1996) – Actors briefly portray Blair and John Major announcing the creation of a coalition government at the start of the alien invasion from the movie Independence Day
 The News Huddlines (1997–2001)
 House 7 (a Russian radio soap) (1997) – Himself in cameo role

References